De Cottignon was a French sailor who competed in the 1900 Summer Olympics.

He was crew member of the French boat Gwendoline 2, which won a bronze medal in the first race of the 2 to 3 ton class. He also participated in the Open class, but did not finish the race.

Further reading

References

External links

French male sailors (sport)
Sailors at the 1900 Summer Olympics – 2 to 3 ton
Sailors at the 1900 Summer Olympics – Open class
Olympic sailors of France
Year of birth missing
Year of death missing
Olympic bronze medalists for France
Place of birth missing
Place of death missing
Missing middle or first names